The Yukon Liberal Party is a political party in the territory of Yukon, Canada. The party is not organizationally linked to the federal Liberal Party of Canada in any official manner.

History
After twenty years as a minor party, the Yukon Liberal Party won the 2000 general election and formed a government under Premier Pat Duncan. The government, however, was reduced to minority government status. Duncan called a snap election for November 2002 in the hope of regaining her government's majority. The party was almost completely wiped out, however, by the Yukon Party. Duncan won the Liberals' sole seat in the Yukon Party's landslide.

The Liberal Party remained in opposition until the 2016 general election where the party went from third place in the legislature to majority government with its leader, Sandy Silver, becoming Premier.

Election results

Leaders
Iain MacKay 1978–1981
Ron Veale 1981–1984
Roger Coles 1984–1986
Jim McLachlan 1986–1989
Paul Thériault 1989–1992
Jack Cable 1992–1995 
Ken Taylor 1995–1997
Jack Cable 1997–1998 
Pat Duncan 1998–2005
Arthur Mitchell 2005–2011
Darius Elias 2011–2012 
Sandy Silver 2012–2023
Ranj Pillai 2023-present

External links
Yukon Liberal Party 
Yukon Liberal Caucus 
Yukon Federal Liberal Association Riding 
Constitution of Yukon liberal party (PDF)

See also
List of political parties in Canada
List of premiers of Yukon
List of Yukon Leaders of Opposition

Notes

Territorial political parties in Yukon
Liberal parties in Canada
1978 establishments in Yukon
Centrist parties in Canada